Robert E. Colville (1935 – September 11, 2018) was a Democratic politician and attorney from Pennsylvania.

Professional career
After graduating from North Catholic High School in 1953, Colville joined the Marines. He later attended Duquesne University, where he obtained his BA in 1963. Colville then returned to North Catholic, where he was a teacher, and the school's head football coach.

While Chief in 1974 he started the department on testing for promotions.

From 1971 through 1975, Colville served as Pittsburgh Chief of Police under Mayor Pete Flaherty.

Political and legal career
He was the Allegheny County District Attorney from 1976, when he defeated incumbent John Hickton, until 1998. Colville contemplated a run for the Pennsylvania Supreme Court in 1981. In 1997, he was elected to the Allegheny County Court of Common Pleas, and in 2006, he was appointed to the Pennsylvania Superior Court.

References

See also

Pittsburgh Police
Allegheny County Sheriff
Allegheny County Police Department

Lawyers from Pittsburgh
County district attorneys in Pennsylvania
Chiefs of the Pittsburgh Bureau of Police
Duquesne University alumni
2018 deaths
Year of birth missing